The Ford Bronco Sport is a compact crossover SUV sold by Ford and marketed under the Bronco nameplate. It was released alongside the Bronco body-on-frame SUV, featuring a similar retro and off-road styling in a smaller footprint. The vehicle is based on the front-wheel drive-based, unibody C2 platform, which is also used by the Ford Escape crossover and Maverick pickup.

Powertrain

Engine 
The Bronco Sport has two engine options. Both engines are mated to an 8-speed automatic transmission.

4x4 drive system 
The Bronco Sport comes equipped with an all-wheel drive system with "G.O.A.T. Modes" (Goes Over Any Terrain). The G.O.A.T. modes allow the driver to select different terrains for the 4x4 system. The Bronco Sport has four-wheel independent suspension. Only the Badlands model has a twin-clutch rear differential that can act as a rear differential locker based on the GK drive system used in the Focus RS, and has torque vectoring. Unlike the Bronco, the Bronco Sport does not have a low-range transfer case. Instead of having traditional front bump stops, the Badlands model Bronco Sport has hydraulic bump stops. The Base, Big Bend, and Outer Banks models share the same AWD system as the Escape, with proprietary programming for off-road use. The Bronco Sport has the tow capability of  depending on the engine.

Trims 

For launch, the Bronco Sport is available in five trims, but the First Edition trim is limited to only 2,000 units. All trims come standard with G.O.A.T mode, a flip-up rear glass and rear flood lights in the tailgate. The 8-inch infotainment system with SYNC 3 is standard across all trims. 

Base

The Base is the entry-level trim of the Bronco Sport lineup. It is equipped with the 1.5-litre three-cylinder Ecoboost gasoline engine mated to a rotary-controlled eight-speed automatic transmission, aluminum-alloy wheels, the SYNC 3 touchscreen infotainment system with SiriusXM Satellite Radio (SiriusXM was deleted for the 2022 model year) and wired Apple CarPlay and Android Auto smartphone integration, keyless entry, cloth seating surfaces, a six-speaker audio system, and a 4.2-inch full-color LCD instrument cluster display screen.

Big Bend

The Big Bend trim level is the mid-level model of the Bronco Sport lineup. It adds convenience features onto the Base trim, such as SiriusXM Satellite Radio (starting with the 2022 model year), a keyless access system with a push-button ignition, a MOLLE Strap System, and a rear seat back protector. 

Outer Banks

The Outer Banks trim level is the luxury-oriented model of the Bronco Sport lineup. It adds luxury amenities onto the Big Bend trim level, such as eighteen-inch tires and aluminum-alloy wheels, combination leather-and-cloth-trimmed seating surfaces, and a Shadow Black-painted front grille with white 'BRONCO' lettering.

Badlands

The Badlands trim level is the off-road oriented model of the Bronco Sport lineup. It is powered by the 2.0-litre four-cylinder Ecoboost gasoline engine mated to a rotary-controlled eight-speed automatic transmission (the Badlands is the only trim level in the Bronco Sport lineup to receive the higher-output engine), and adds features such as two additional "G.O.A.T. Modes" for the four wheel drive system and all-terrain tires and unique aluminum-alloy wheels onto the mid-level Big Bend trim level.

First Edition

The First Edition trim level, only available for the 2021 model year, was based on the off-road oriented Badlands trim, and included almost all of its available options and packages (such as luxury leather-trimmed seating surfaces, dual heated front bucket seats, and a Bang and Olufsen premium amplified audio system). Ford's CoPilot 360 Assist+ was the only available option not offered on the First Edition. Production was limited to 2,000 units. 

Along with the regular options, Ford is also offering bundles on all trims with certain accessories. The four bundles offered are: Bike, Camp, Snow, and Water.

Safety 
The 2022 Bronco Sport was awarded the "Top Safety Pick +" by the Insurance Institute for Highway Safety.

Sales

References

External links 

 

Bronco Sport
Cars introduced in 2020
Compact sport utility vehicles
Crossover sport utility vehicles
All-wheel-drive vehicles
Retro-style automobiles